The 1952 Minnesota lieutenant gubernatorial election took place on November 5, 1952. Republican Party of Minnesota candidate Ancher Nelsen defeated Minnesota Democratic-Farmer-Labor Party challenger Arthur Hansen.

Results

External links
 Election Returns

Minnesota
Lieutenant Gubernatorial
1952